The "UND Alma Mater" is a school song of the University of North Dakota in Grand Forks, North Dakota. The Carillon Americana bells at the top of Twamley Hall on campus play the tune of Alma Mater each day at noon.

Notes

External links
Alma Mater - und.edu

University of North Dakota
American college songs
Alma mater songs
Year of song missing
Song articles with missing songwriters